This is a list of division champions (since ) and wild-card winners (since ) in Major League Baseball.

Division champions
 indicates the winner of the World Series.

Four-division alignment (1969–1993)

Team names link to the season in which each team played

† Due to the strike that took place in the middle of the 1981 season, Major League Baseball crowned both a "first half" (pre-strike) and "second half" (post-strike) division champion.  The teams were then matched against each other in a special division series.  Oakland and New York won the 1981 American League Division Series while Los Angeles and Montreal won the 1981 National League Division Series.

Six-division alignment (1994–present)
Team names link to the season in which each team played

‡ The 1994 season was shortened by a strike that resulted in the cancellation of the rest of the season, including the World Series. The teams listed were leading their divisions at the time the strike began.

Wild card winners
 indicates the winner of the World Series.

Italics indicates the winner of the division series.

Bold indicates the winner of the League Championship Series

One Wild Card (1995–2011)

Team names link to the season in which each team played

Two Wild Cards (2012–2019, 2021)

Winner of the wild card game in bold

† For the 2020 season, the postseason consisted of eight teams per league; the top two teams in each division and two wild card teams from among the remaining teams.

Three Wild Cards (2022–present)

See also

AL pennant winners
NL pennant winners
World Series champions
MLB postseason
MLB postseason teams
MLB franchise postseason droughts
MLB rivalries
Home advantage

Major League Baseball postseason